Novoalexeyevka is a rural locality (a selo) in Novopeschansky Selsoviet, Burlinsky District, Altai Krai, Russia. The population was 140 as of 2013. It was founded in 1907. There are 4 streets.

Geography 
Novoalexeyevka is located near the Burla river 25 km northeast of Burla (the district's administrative centre) by road. Novopeschanoye is the nearest rural locality.

References 

Rural localities in Burlinsky District